V. M. Ummer Master is a politician and social activist from Kozhikode district. He is a member of IUML. He contested as UDF Candidate from Thiruvambady constituency in 2016 legislative assembly but lost to CPIM candidate George M. Thomas by a margin of 3008 votes.

Political career
Ummer Master was the MLA of Koduvally constituency in 2011 and  won by a margin of 16,552.  He is one of the 14 MLAs who achieved 100 per cent attendance by being present in the Assembly on all the 16 sessions. He lost in the 2016 assembly election and 2006 assembly election from Thiruvambady constituency to the same opponent in 2006 and 2016 legislative assembly George M Thomas.

References

Kerala MLAs 2011–2016
People from Kozhikode district
Living people
Year of birth missing (living people)
Indian Union Muslim League politicians